Johann Alvin Normand Jacobsen (April 17, 1930 – April 17, 2019) was a logging company owner and political figure in British Columbia. He represented Dewdney in the Legislative Assembly of British Columbia from 1986 to 1991 as a Social Credit member.

He was born in New Westminster, British Columbia in 1930, the son of Johannes Jacobsen and Elida Ericsen, and was educated in Mission. In 1977, he married Launi Gay Loveday and has two children, Tore Jacobsen(1979) and Heidi Jacobsen(1981). He was mayor of Maple Ridge from 1976 to 1981. Jacobsen served in the provincial cabinet as Minister of Labour and Consumer Services and as Minister of Social Services and Housing. He ran for the leadership of the Social Credit Party in 1991. He died on April 17, 2019, his 89th birthday.

References 

British Columbia Social Credit Party MLAs
1930 births
Canadian loggers
2019 deaths
Mayors of places in British Columbia
Members of the Executive Council of British Columbia